Miguel Rayderley Zapata Santana (born May 26, 1993) is a Spanish male artistic gymnast of Dominican Republic origin, and a member of the national team. He won the gold medal in the men's floor exercise at the 2015 European Games, and bronze at the 2015 World Artistic Gymnastics Championships in Glasgow. Zapata was also selected to compete for the Spanish squad at the 2016 Summer Olympics in Rio de Janeiro, missing out of the final by almost two tenths of a point from the qualifying phase of his signature apparatus exercise. Zapata won a silver medal for Spain in the men's floor exercise event of the artistic gymnastics competition at the 2020 Tokyo Summer Olympics.

Zapata also has one of the three most difficult elements in men's artistic gymnastics named after him called the Zapata 2 on floor, or double front layout with 1 twist, with the other two elements are the Miyachi on high bar and Nagornyy on floor to be assigned the highest difficulty value of I (0.9). Zapata also owns the Zapata on floor, which is a double front tucked with 1 twist and assigned a difficulty value of G (0.7).

Notes

References

External links

 
 
 
 
 

1993 births
Living people
Sportspeople from Santo Domingo
Naturalised citizens of Spain
Spanish people of Dominican Republic descent
Sportspeople of Dominican Republic descent
Spanish male artistic gymnasts
Sportspeople from Las Palmas
Gymnasts at the 2015 European Games
European Games medalists in gymnastics
European Games gold medalists for Spain
Gymnasts at the 2016 Summer Olympics
Olympic gymnasts of Spain
Medalists at the World Artistic Gymnastics Championships
Mediterranean Games gold medalists for Spain
Mediterranean Games medalists in gymnastics
Competitors at the 2018 Mediterranean Games
Gymnasts at the 2020 Summer Olympics
Medalists at the 2020 Summer Olympics
Olympic medalists in gymnastics
Olympic silver medalists for Spain
20th-century Spanish people
21st-century Spanish people